Petko Stefanov (born 19 January 1972) is a Bulgarian long-distance runner. He competed in the men's marathon at the 1996 Summer Olympics and the 2000 Summer Olympics.

References

1972 births
Living people
Athletes (track and field) at the 1996 Summer Olympics
Athletes (track and field) at the 2000 Summer Olympics
Bulgarian male long-distance runners
Bulgarian male marathon runners
Olympic athletes of Bulgaria
Place of birth missing (living people)
21st-century Bulgarian people
20th-century Bulgarian people